Ardelia Ripley Hall (1899–1979) was a cultural affairs officer at the United States Department of State from 1946 to 1964, where she specialized in post-World War II restitution of Nazi-looted art.

Born in Weymouth, Massachusetts, she attended Smith College and Columbia University for her bachelor's and master's degrees, respectively.

In 1945, Hall was appointed as the Consultant in the Division of Cultural Cooperation for Japan and Korea, acting as a liaison between Roberts Commission and the Monuments, Fine Arts, and Archives officers in the Pacific Theater. After briefly serving as an MFAA officer in Europe, she began working as the Fine Arts & Monuments Adviser to the State Department, where she remained until her retirement in 1964. She was "the driving force at the State Department for postwar restitution between 1946 and 1962."

External links
Ardelia Hall Collection at NARA

References

1890s births
1979 deaths
Monuments men
Smith College alumni
Columbia University alumni
Art and cultural repatriation after World War II
United States Department of State officials